Riley Hill, North Carolina, United States, is an unincorporated community in mideastern Wake County. It is at the southern end of Broughton Road, on Riley Hill Road and is approximately six miles northeast of Knightdale, and approximately 3.8 miles north of the intersection of U.S. 64/264, and Business U.S. 64.

Perry Farm, listed on the National Register of Historic Places, is located in Riley Hill.

External links
 Riley Hill at the U.S. Geographic Names Information System

Unincorporated communities in Wake County, North Carolina
Research Triangle
Unincorporated communities in North Carolina